Logarska Dolina is a settlement in the Logar Valley in the Municipality of Solčava in northern Slovenia. The area belongs to the traditional region of Styria and is now included in the Savinja Statistical Region.

There is a small church in the settlement. It is dedicated to Christ the King and belongs to the Parish of Solčava. It was built from 1930 to 1931.

References

External links

Logarska Dolina on Geopedia

Populated places in the Municipality of Solčava
Logar Valley (Slovenia)